Mokhov (from мох meaning moss), female form Mokhova is a Russian surname.

Notable people with this surname include:

Viktor Mokhov (born 1950), Russian criminal 
Mokhov (musician), stage name of Oleg Mokhov, Russian-born American electronic music producer

Russian-language surnames